Rhabdophis akraios, the Singalang keelback, is a keelback snake in the family Colubridae. It is endemic to Sumatra, Indonesia.

The two known specimens measure  in total length. They were collected from Mount Singalang (West Sumatra) by Odoardo Beccari in 1878. There is no recent information on this species.

References

Rhabdophis
Snakes of Indonesia
Endemic fauna of Sumatra
Reptiles described in 2013